This is a listing of the horses that finished in either first, second, or third place and the number of starters in the Santa Anita Derby, an American Grade 1 race for three-year-olds at 1-1/8 miles on the dirt held at Santa Anita Park in Arcadia, California.  (List 1973–present)

References 

Santa Anita Park
Lists of horse racing results
Triple Crown Prep Races